The Climber is a 1917 silent film drama film directed by Henry King and starring himself. The film is listed as a four-reeler, which makes it fall somewhere between a 'short' film and a 'feature' film.

Cast
Henry King - William Beerheiim Van Broon
Jack McLaughlin - Bruce Crosby
Gibson Gowland - Buck Stringer (*billed T.H. Gibson Gowland)
Robert Ensminger - Grafton
Charles Blaisdell - Tom Tarney
James Kerr - Sweeney
Bruce Smith - Slats O'Keefe
Frank Erlanger - 'Happy'
Lucille Pietz - Eva Crosby
Leah Gibbs - Ethel Crosby
Arma Carlton - Madelyn Rosseau
Mollie McConnell - Mrs. Crosby
Ruth Lackaye - Mrs. Tarney

Preservation
The film survives incomplete in the Library of Congress collection.

References

External links
The Climber at IMDb.com

1917 films
American silent short films
American black-and-white films
Films directed by Henry King
Silent American drama films
1917 drama films
1910s English-language films
1910s American films
American drama short films